The 1978–79 Magyar Kupa (English: Hungarian Cup) was the 39th season of Hungary's annual knock-out cup football competition.

Final

See also
 1978–79 Nemzeti Bajnokság I

References

External links
 Official site 
 soccerway.com

1978–79 in Hungarian football
1978–79 domestic association football cups
1978-79